USS Ardent (MCM-12) is an  mine countermeasures ship in the United States Navy.

She was built by Peterson Shipbuilders, Sturgeon Bay, Wisconsin. Ardent is homeported at San Diego, California and is part of the U.S. 3rd Fleet.

Her Command History for 1993-94 indicates that '.. 
on 1 November 1994 a reorganization of the U.S. Navy's Mine Countermeasures Community took place. Commander, Mine Warfare Command ceased to be Type Commander for the ships homeported in Ingleside, Texas; and a new entity, Naval Surface Group Ingleside, was created to serve as local agent for the new Type Commander, Commander, Naval Surface Forces Atlantic. NSG Ingleside was also intended to give the Ingleside ships "cradle to grave" assistance and supervision. In the new organization, ARDENT was assigned to Mine Countermeasures Squadron 3 (MCMRON 3). ARDENT remained in MCMRON 3 through the end of 1994.

Ardent held a decommissioning ceremony at Naval Base San Diego on 17 August 2020 and was officially decommissioned on 27th of the same month.

References

External links
 Official page

 

Avenger-class mine countermeasures ships
Ships built in Sturgeon Bay, Wisconsin
1991 ships
Minehunters of the United States